Hanley railway station was built by the North Staffordshire Railway as part of the Potteries Loop Line and served the town of Hanley, Staffordshire, England.

History 
The original station opened along with the first section of the Loop in 1864, but when the latter reached Burslem in 1873, a new station was built on a sharp curve (8 chains radius) in a cutting below Trinity Street. The old station remained in use for goods traffic.

No trace of the station remains today; the cutting is filled in and is the site of the car park of the former Grand Hotel (previously the Stakis Hotel, then the Quality Hotel and now the Best Western Hotel).

References

External links
 Hanley Station page on Potteries.org

Disused railway stations in Stoke-on-Trent
Railway stations in Great Britain closed in 1964
Railway stations in Great Britain opened in 1864
Former North Staffordshire Railway stations
Beeching closures in England